Adoneta is a genus of moths in the family Limacodidae. The genus was erected by James Brackenridge Clemens in 1860. There are at least four described species in Adoneta.

Species
 Adoneta bicaudata Dyar, 1904 (long-horned slug moth)
 Adoneta gemina Dyar, 1906
 Adoneta pygmaea Grote & Robinson, 1868
 Adoneta spinuloides (Herrich-Schäffer, 1854) (purple-crested slug moth)

References

Further reading

External links

 Butterflies and Moths of North America
 NCBI Taxonomy Browser, Adoneta

Limacodidae
Limacodidae genera